The Royal Court of Sweden is the official name for the organisation (royal households) that supports the monarch, and the royal house. The incumbent monarch, King Carl XVI Gustaf, is head of the Royal Court.

Organizational structure
The Royal Court is divided into segments:
 The Office of the Marshal of the Realm
 The Office of the Marshal of the Court
 The Queen's Household
 The Crown Princess's Household
 The Ceremonial Household
 The Royal Collections with the 
 Office of the Governor of the Royal Palaces
 Royal Stables
 The Household
 Patronage
 Information and Press Department

The Office of the Marshal of the Realm is currently headed by Fredrik Wersäll, who is accountable to the King for the activities of the entire Royal Court organization.

The Marshal of the Realm is responsible for contacts with the government and Riksdag.

Supporting the Marshal of the Realm is the staff office with a Permanent Secretary at the Office of the Marshal of the Realm and a Court Secretary.

See also
 Curia regis
 Royal court
 Swedish Royal Academies

References

External links

 Royal Court of Sweden access-date = 2022-01-29

Court
Sweden